Ancient to the Future: Dreaming of the Masters Series Vol. 1 is a 1987 album by the Art Ensemble of Chicago released on the Japanese DIW label. It features performances by Lester Bowie, Joseph Jarman, Roscoe Mitchell, Malachi Favors Maghostut and Don Moye with Bahnamous Lee Bowie guesting.

Reception
The Allmusic review by Brian Olewnick describes the album as "Considered by some to be the Art Ensemble's "pop" record, this album is also one of the very best from the latter portion of their career".

Track listing 
 "Sangaredi/Blues for Zen" (Moye/Jarman) - 9:02  
 "Creole Love Call" (Ellington) - 5:55  
 "These Arms of Mine" (Redding) - 5:12  
 "No Woman, No Cry" (Ford, Marley) - 9:23  
 "Purple Haze" (Hendrix) - 5:36  
 "Zombie" (Kuti) - 5:52  
 Recorded March 17–19, 1987 in Brooklyn

Personnel 
 Lester Bowie: trumpet, fluegelhorn
 Malachi Favors Maghostut: bass, percussion instruments
 Joseph Jarman: saxophones, clarinets, percussion instruments
 Roscoe Mitchell: saxophones, clarinets, flute, percussion instruments 
 Don Moye: drums, percussion
 Bahnamous Lee Bowie: synthesizer

References 

1987 albums
DIW Records albums
Art Ensemble of Chicago albums